The 1960–61 SM-sarja season was the 30th season of the SM-sarja, the top level of ice hockey in Finland. 10 teams participated in the league, and Tappara Tampere won the championship.

Regular season

External links 
 Season on hockeyarchives.info

Fin
Liiga seasons
1960–61 in Finnish ice hockey